Bonansea is an Italian surname. Notable people with the surname include:

Alan Bonansea (born 1996), Argentine football forward 
Barbara Bonansea (born 1991), Italian football player
Miranda Bonansea (1926–2019), Italian actress and voice actress

Italian-language surnames